Baker House may refer to:

In Australia
 Baker House (Bacchus Marsh, Victoria)

In the United States
(by state then city)
 Collums-Baker House, Bee Branch, Arkansas
 Baker House (North Little Rock, Arkansas) in Pulaski County
 Pearl Baker Row House, Rancho Santa Fe, California, NRHP-listed in San Diego County
 Baker House (Sea Ranch, California)
 Baker House (Fort Collins, Colorado), NRHP-listed in Larimer County
Baker House, historic home of David Hume Baker in Orange Home, Florida
 Samuel Baker House (Elfers, Florida) in Pasco County
 Bond-Baker-Carter House, Royston, Georgia, NRHP-listed in Franklin County
 James V. and Sophia Baker House, Cottonwood in Idaho County
 George Baker House, Glen Ellyn, Illinois in DuPage County
 Bressmer-Baker House, Springfield, Illinois in Sangamon County
 Frank J. Baker House, Wilmette, Illinois in Cook County
 C.H. Baker Double House, Des Moines, Iowa in Polk County
 Francis and Harriet Baker House, Atchison, Kansas in Atchison County
 James Baker House (Burkesville, Kentucky) in Cumberland County
 Paschal Todd Baker House, Carrollton, Kentucky, NRHP-listed in Carroll County
 Baker-Hawkins House, Louisville, Kentucky, NRHP-listed in Portland, Louisville, Kentucky
 Fuller-Baker Log House, Grantsville, Maryland
 James B. Baker House, Aberdeen, Maryland
 Hugh P. Baker House, Amherst, Massachusetts, a dormitory at the University of Massachusetts Amherst
 Abbot-Baker House, Andover, Massachusetts
 Benjamin Baker Jr. House, Barnstable, Massachusetts in Barnstable County
 Capt. Seth Baker Jr. House, Barnstable, Massachusetts in Barnstable County
 Nathaniel Baker House, Barnstable, Massachusetts in Barnstable County
Baker House, Cambridge, Massachusetts, a dormitory at MIT
 Baker House (Rehoboth, Massachusetts)
 Charles Baker House, Waltham, Massachusetts
Kenelum Baker House, Winchester, Massachusetts
 Peter Baker Three-Decker, Worcester, Massachusetts in Worcester County
 Henry W. Baker House, Plymouth, Michigan
 Sylvester Marion and Frances Anne Stephens Baker House, Montgomery City, Missouri in Montgomery County
 I.G. Baker House, Fort Benton, Montana, NRHP-listed in Chouteau County
 Millhiser-Baker Farm, Roswell, New Mexico
 Baker-Brearley House, Lawrenceville, New Jersey in Mercer County
 J. Thompson Baker House, Wildwood City, New Jersey
 Baker-Merrill House, Easton, New York
 J. and E. Baker Cobblestone Farmstead, Macedon, New York in New York
 George F. Baker Jr. and Sr. Houses, New York, New York, listed on the NRHP in New York
 Sebastian Baker Stone House, Rochester, New York, listed on the NRHP in New York
 Cullins-Baker House, Smalls Crossroads, North Carolina
 Jennings-Baker House, Reidsville, North Carolina
 Latham-Baker House, Greensboro, North Carolina
John S. Baker House, Cincinnati, Ohio
John C. Baker House, Mechanicsburg, Ohio, NRHP-listed in Champaign County
 O.T. Baker House, Wellington, Ohio, NRHP-listed in Lorain County
 W. C. Baker House, Altus, Oklahoma
 Sophenia Ish Baker House, Medford, Oregon, NRHP-listed in Jackson County
 Hiram Baker House, Lebanon, Oregon, NRHP-listed in Linn County
 Horace Baker Log Cabin, Carver, Oregon in Clackamas County
 David S. Baker Estate, North Kingstown, Rhode Island in Washington County
 William Baker House, Gaston, South Carolina in Calhoun County
 Baker House (Alcester, South Dakota) in Union County
 Joseph Baker House, Hereford, South Dakota, NRHP-listed in Meade County
 Baker Bungalow, Spearfish, South Dakota, NRHP-listed in Lawrence County
 J. T. Baker Farmstead, Blum, Texas, NRHP-listed in Hill County, Texas
 Charles H. and Catherine B. Baker House, Goliad, Texas, NRHP-listed in Goliad County
 Baker-Carmichael House, Granbury, Texas, NRHP-listed in Hood County
 Baker House (Yoakum, Texas), NRHP-listed in Lavaca County
 George Washington Baker House, Mendon, Utah
 Samuel Baker House (Mendon, Utah)
 Baker-St. John House, Abingdon, Virginia in Washington County
 Newton D. Baker House, Washington, D.C.
 Michael Baker House, also known as Alexander W. Arbuckle I House, Lewisburg, West Virginia, NRHP-listed
 Baker House 1885, also known as Robert H. Baker House, Lake Geneva, Wisconsin, NRHP-listed in Walworth County as "Redwood Cottage"
 Jim Baker Cabin, Savery, Wyoming in Carbon County

See also
 Baker Farm (disambiguation)
James Baker House (disambiguation)
John Baker House (disambiguation)
 Samuel Baker House (disambiguation)
 Baker House (Bacchus Marsh, Victoria)